Thomas B. Cahill (October 11, 1919 – October 29, 1992) was an American football player and coach who served as the head coach at the United States Military Academy from 1966 to 1973 and at Union College in Schenectady, New York from 1976 to 1979, compiling a career college football record of 51–59–3.

During his tenure as head coach at Army, which coincided with the height of the Vietnam War, his teams beat Navy five times. Following the 1966 season, the Eddie Robinson Coach of the Year award was bestowed upon Cahill. Following a 51–0 defeat at the hands of Navy to conclude the 1973 season, Cahill was dismissed as head coach.  Cahill died on October 29, 1992 in Schenectady after a heart attack.

Head coaching record

College football

References

1919 births
1992 deaths
Army Black Knights football coaches
Niagara Purple Eagles football players
Union Dutchmen baseball coaches
Union Dutchmen football coaches
High school football coaches in New Jersey
High school football coaches in New York (state)
United States Army personnel of World War II
United States Army officers
Manlius Pebble Hill School
People from Fayetteville, New York